"Buck Wild" is a 1989 single released by the Washington, D.C.-based go-go band Experience Unlimited.  The song was released as the first single from their 1989 album Livin' Large. The single peaked at #7 on Billboard's "Hot R&B/Hip-Hop songs" chart, on May 13, 1989.

Track listing

A-Side
"Buck Wild" (12" Mix) – 5:41
"Buck Wild" (B-Boy Mix) – 4:21

B-Side
"Buck Wild" (Dub) – 3:35
"Buck Wild" (Instrumental) – 4:02
"Express" – 4:19

References

1989 songs
Experience Unlimited songs
Virgin Records singles
New jack swing songs